Line 10 of Chongqing Rail Transit is a rapid transit line that opened on 28 December 2017. Rapid trains started operating on Line 10 in June 2020.

Opening timeline

Stations (north to south)

Notes

References

 
Railway lines opened in 2017
Airport rail links in China
2017 establishments in China